The Delaware Valley School District is a midsized, rural, public school district located in Pike County, Pennsylvania. Delaware Valley School District encompasses 196.12 mi² (507.9 km²), covering the Boroughs of Matamoras and Milford and Delaware Township, Dingman Township, Milford Township, Shohola Township and Westfall Township in Pike County, Pennsylvania. According to 2020 federal census data, it serves a resident population of 29,996. In 2009, the district residents’ per capita income was $20,553, while the median family income was $51,674. In the Commonwealth, the median family income was $49,501 and the United States median family income was $49,445, in 2010.

The district operates one High School, two Middle Schools and four Elementary Schools.

Schools

Elementary schools 
 Delaware Valley Elementary School (K-5th)
 Dingman Delaware Primary School (K-2nd)
 Dingman Delaware Elementary School (3rd-5th)
 Shohola Elementary School (K-5th)

Secondary schools 
 Delaware Valley Middle School (6th-8th)
 Dingman Delaware Middle School (6th-8th)
 Delaware Valley High School (9th-12th)

References

Pocono Mountains
School districts in Pike County, Pennsylvania